Ichthyosauridae is an extinct family of thunnosaur ichthyosaurs from the latest Triassic and Early Jurassic (Rhaetian to Pliensbachian stages) of Europe, and possibly also from the middle Early Cretaceous (Hauterivian or Barremian stage) of Iraq. Named by Charles Lucien Bonaparte, in 1841, it is usually thought to contain a single genus, Ichthyosaurus, which is known from several species from the Early Jurassic. In 2013, Fischer et al. named and described Malawania anachronus from the middle Early Cretaceous of Iraq. It was found to share several synapomorphies with the type species of this family, Ichthyosaurus communis, and a large phylogenetic analysis recovered these species as sister taxa. Despite its geologically younger age, M. anachronus was also assigned to Ichthyosauridae.

Phylogeny
Fischer et al. (2013) applied the name Ichthyosauridae Bonaparte, 1841 for the clade that contains Malawania anachronus and Ichthyosaurus communis. This clade was recovered in the phylogenetic analysis that was based on the largest currently available data matrix of parvipelvian species. Most other phylogenetic analyses, that were based on smaller matrices, also recovered this clade or found M. anachronus to be in a more basal position. Ichthyosauridae was recovered as the sister taxon of Baracromia, a clade first defined by Fischer et al. (2013) that includes all other thunnosaurs. The cladogram below follows the large phylogenetic analysis of Fischer et al. (2013).

Cladogram

References

Ichthyosaurs of Europe
Late Triassic ichthyosaurs
Early Jurassic ichthyosaurs
Middle Jurassic ichthyosaurs
Late Jurassic ichthyosaurs
Early Cretaceous ichthyosaurs
Jurassic reptiles of Europe
Cretaceous reptiles of Europe
Rhaetian first appearances
Early Cretaceous extinctions
Taxa named by Charles Lucien Bonaparte
Prehistoric reptile families